Golden Lily or The Golden Lily may refer to:

Plants
Sandersonia, also known as golden lily of the valley
Lilium bosniacum, also known as Zlatni Ljiljan (Bosnian, 'golden lily'), native to Bosnia and Herzegovina
Bulbine bulbosa, or golden lily, endemic to Australia

Arts and entertainment
The Golden Lily, an 1899 book by Katharine Tynan
The Golden Lily (Mead novel), a 2012 novel in the Bloodlines series by Richelle Mead
Golden Lily, subtitle of Philippine TV series Wildflower (season 3)

Other uses
 Golden Lily, Illinois, a place in the U.S.
 Golden Lily (Bosnia and Herzegovina), a national symbol of Bosnia and Herzegovina
Kin no yuri (Japanese, 'The Golden Lily'), a secret Japanese WWII organization to loot gold
The ŠKODA Award "The Golden Lily" for Best Film, awarded at the GoEast film festival 2001–2012
Order of the Golden Lily, an order of Bosnia and Herzegovina
Lis de Ouro (Golden Lily), an award in Scouting in Brazil

See also
Fleur-de-lis, a stylized lily used as a decorative design or motif